Paul Day may refer to:
 Paul Day (musician) (born 1956), lead vocalist of Iron Maiden, 1975–76
 Paul Day (sculptor) (born 1967), British sculptor
 Paul William Day, Australian producer, director, musician
 Paul Day (table tennis) (born 1958),table tennis player from England